John Bright (1811–1889) was a British radical and liberal statesman.

John Bright may also refer to:

Arts and entertainment
John Bright (screenwriter) (1908–1989), American journalist and screenwriter
John Bright (costume designer) (born 1940), British costume designer
John Bright, a character in the TV series Silk

Politics and law
Sir John Bright, 1st Baronet (1619–1688), English soldier and Member of Parliament
John Morgan Bright (1817–1911), U.S. Representative from Tennessee
John Albert Bright (1848–1924), British Liberal Unionist politician
John Fulmer Bright (1877–1923), mayor of Richmond, Virginia
John Bright (judge) (1884–1948), U.S. federal judge

Others
John Bright (physician) (1783–1870), English physician
Johnny Bright (baseball) (1888–1908), American baseball player
John Bright (biblical scholar) (1908–1995), American biblical scholar
Johnny Bright (1930–1983), American football player in the Canadian Football League